Jessica Horn (born 1979) is a Ugandan feminist activist, writer, poet, and technical advisor on women's rights Her work focuses on women's rights, bodily autonomy and freedom from violence, and African feminist movement building. She was named as an African woman changemaker by ARISE Magazine and as one of Applause Africa's "40 African Changemakers under 40". She joined the African Women's Development Fund as director of programmes in October 2015.

Early life and education
Horn was born in England to a Ugandan mother and father from the United States, and grew up in Lesotho and Fiji. She completed her international baccalaureate at the Armand Hammer United World College of the American West. She earned a Bachelor of Arts degree (magna cum laude) in anthropology from Smith College in 2001 and a Master of Science (Distinction) degree in gender and development from the London School of Economics in 2002.

Career 
Horn began her formal career in women's rights at the organisation RAINBO where she worked as coordinator of Amanitare - the African Network on Sexual and Reproductive Rights. She went on to manage funding for women's rights and minority rights at the Sigrid Rausing Trust, one of the largest private human rights funders in Europe. She then went on to found Akiiki Consulting, where she worked with human rights funders, policy institutions, and activist organisations, including the Stephen Lewis Foundation, the International Rescue Committee, Action Aid, the Association for Women's Rights in Development, Ford Foundation East Africa, and the United Nations. This included extensive travel and work in conflict-affected countries in Africa. She is the director of programmes at the African Women's Development Fund.

As an action researcher, Horn was awarded a Soros Reproductive Health and Rights Fellowship in 2003 and conducted research on feminist responses to female genital mutilation in Egypt. She wrote two monographs on the impact of Christian fundamentalism on women's rights in Africa for the Association for Women's Rights in Development (AWID) Challenging Religious Fundamentalisms initiative. She is the lead author of the Cutting Edge Pack on Gender and Social Movements produced by BRIDGE at the Institute for Development Studies, University of Sussex in 2013.

Horn has served as an advisor to philanthropic and women's rights initiatives, including Mama Cash, Urgent Action Fund-Africa, Comic Relief, the Kings College Conflict, Security & Development Group Knowledge Building and Mentoring Programme, and the journal Development. She worked as commissioning editor of "Our Africa" on openDemocracy 5050 from 2011 to 2015. She is a founder member of the African Feminist Forum Working Group.

Poetry
Horn won the IRN FannyAnn Eddy Poetry Award in 2009 for her poem "They have killed Sizakele" and the Sojourner Poetry Prize judged by June Jordan in 2001 for her poem "Dis U.N: For Rwanda". Her prose-poem "Dreamings" was profiled in the International Museum of Women's online exhibition Imagining Ourselves. She is also the author of a collection, Speaking in Tongues (Mouthmark, 2006), which is included in the collected Mouthmark Book of Poetry alongside work by Warsan Shire, Malika Booker, and Inua Ellams. Her work has been featured on the Pan-African poetry platform Badilisha Poetry Radio.

As an activist poet, Horn has used poetry as a medium to discuss human rights abuses and explore the concept of revolutionary love, including through poetry platform The Love Mic.

Selected publications

Research and analysis 
 Michau, Lori, Jessica Horn, Amy Bank, Mallika Dutt, and Cathy Zimmerman. 2014. "Prevention of violence against women and girls: lessons from practice", The Lancet.
 Horn, Jessica. 2013. Gender and Social Movements: Cutting Edge Pack, BRIDGE/ Institute for Development Studies, University of Sussex. 
 Horn, Jessica. 2012. Not as simple as ABC: Christian fundamentalisms and HIV/AIDS responses in Africa. Toronto: Association for Women's Rights in Development.
 Horn, Jessica and Bisi Adeleye-Fayemi (eds). 2009. Voice, Power and Soul: Portraits of African Feminists. Ghana: AWDF. 
 Horn, Jessica. 2009. "Through the looking glass: Process and power within feminist movements", in Development, Vol 52.2, Power, Movements, Change. London: Sage Publishers, Society for International Development.
 Horn, Jessica. 2006. "Re-righting the sexual body", in Feminist Africa. Cape Town: African Gender Institute.
 Horn, Jessica. 2005. "Not 'culture' but gender: reconceptualising female genital mutilation/cutting", in Where Human Rights Begin: Health, Sexuality and Women Ten Years After Vienna, Cairo, and Beijing. Chavkin, Wendy and  Chesler, Ellen (eds). New Jersey: Rutgers University Press.

Poetry collections

"Speaking in Tongues" in The Mouthmark Book of Poetry, Flipped Eye Publishing Limited, 2013. .

Poems
"A night in Zanzibar", in 
"Uganda haikus (sunrise to 9pm)"
"Sista, why do you run?"
"Ye ye o (between a dancer and a drummer)"
"epidermal offerings" and "salt"

Awards
Winner IRN FannyAnn Eddy Poetry Award 2009
Winner Sojourner Poetry Prize 2001

References

External links 
"Articles by Jessica Horn"

Living people
21st-century Ugandan poets
Ugandan women poets
Kumusha
1979 births
21st-century Ugandan women writers
People educated at a United World College